This is a list of Canadian films which were released in 2015:

See also 
 2015 in Canada
 2015 in Canadian television

References

External links
Feature Films Released In 2015 With Country of Origin Canada at IMDb

2015

Canada